= Loagri =

Loagri is a village in the Mamprugu Moagduri district, a district that was carved out of the West Mamprusi District. The district is located in the North East Region of Ghana.

The people are mostly farmers, fishing is also a common occupation.

Japa and Sabatowan gh are popular Musicians from that place.
